Pa Mí is a song by the American singer Dalex featuring Puerto Rican singer Rafa Pabön. It was released on September 19, 2018. The music video for the song has more than 10 million views on YouTube. The song has over 30 million plays on Spotify.

Background 
The song belongs to the genre Reggaeton and Latin trap, The song was produced by Panamanian producer Dimelo Flow and by Rike Music. The song came out after the remix of Puesto Pal' Millón.

Personnel 
Credits adapted from Tidal.

 Dalex – vocals
 Rafa Pabön – vocals
 Dímelo Flow – producer
 Joshua Mendez – composer
 Sech – vocals (remix)
 Khea – vocals (remix)
 Feid – vocals (remix)
 Cazzu – vocals (remix)
 Lenny Tavarez – vocals (remix)

Remix 
An official remix features other guest appearances, such as Panamanian singer Sech, Argentine rappers Cazzu and Khea, Colombian singer Feid and fellow Puerto Rican singer Lenny Távarez. It was released on February 6, 2019. The music video for the song was released on May 10, 2019. The music video for the song has more than 300 million views on YouTube. The song has over 400 million plays on Spotify. The song belongs to Dalex's debut album Climaxxx.

Charts

Weekly charts

Year-end charts

Certifications

References

External links 
 "Pa Mí Remix" music video at YouTube

2018 songs
2018 singles
2019 singles